Jamnica can refer to:

 Jamnica, Lesser Poland Voivodeship, a village in Poland
 Jamnica, Subcarpathian Voivodeship, a village in Poland
 Jamnica, Prevalje, a village near Prevalje, Slovenia
 Jamnica (company), a water company from Croatia